Radunin  is a village in the administrative district of Gmina Gródek, within Białystok County, Podlaskie Voivodeship, in north-eastern Poland, close to the border with Belarus. The village is occupied by a total population of 537 people.

References

Radunin